Merica is a genus of sea snails, marine gastropod mollusks in the family Cancellariidae, the nutmeg snails.

Species
Species within the genus Merica include:
 † Merica admirabilis Lozouet, 2019 
 Merica aqualica (Petit & Harasewych, 1986)
 Merica asperella (Lamarck, 1822)
 Merica boucheti (Petit & Harasewych, 1986)
 † Merica crenata (Hörnes, 1856) 
 Merica deynzeri Petit & Harasewych, 2000
 Merica ektyphos Petit & Harasewych, 2000
 Merica elegans (G.B. Sowerby I, 1822)
 † Merica estotiensis Lozouet, 2019 
 Merica gigantea (Lee & Lan, 2002)
 † Merica krocki Kovács & Vicián, 2016 
 Merica laticosta (Löbbecke, 1881)
 Merica lussii Petit & Harasewych, 2000
 Merica marisca Bouchet & Petit, 2002
 Merica melanostoma (G.B. Sowerby II, 1849)
 † Merica mutabilis Lozouet, 2019 
 Merica oblonga (G.B. Sowerby I, 1825)
 †Merica obsoleta (Hörnes, 1856) 
 Merica pilasensis Verhecken, 2018
 Merica purpuriformis (Kiener, 1841)
 Merica semperiana (Crosse, 1863)
 Merica sinensis (Reeve, 1856)
 Merica stuardoi (McLean & Andrade, 1982)
 † Merica succineiformis (Boettger, 1906) 
 Merica undulata (G. B. Sowerby II, 1849)
 Merica westralis (Garrard, 1975)
Synonyms:
 Merica (Merica) H. Adams & A. Adams, 1854: alternate representation of Merica H. Adams & A. Adams, 1854 
 Merica (Sydaphera) Iredale, 1929: synonym of Sydaphera Iredale, 1929
 †Merica haweraensis Laws, 1940: synonym of † Scalptia haweraensis (Laws, 1940) 
 † Merica kaiparaensis Laws, 1939: synonym of † Scalptia kaiparaensis (Laws, 1939)  (original combination)
 † Merica mioquadrata Sacco, 1894: synonym of † Perplicaria mioquadrata (Sacco, 1894)  (nov. comb.)
 † Merica pukeuriensis Finlay, 1930: synonym of † Scalptia pukeuriensis (Finlay, 1930)

References

 Petit, R.E. & Harasewych, M.G. (2000). Three new species of the genus Merica (Neogastropoda: Cancellariidae) from South Africa and the Philippines. The Nautilus. 114(4): 142–148.

External links
 Adams, H. & Adams, A. (1853-1858). The genera of Recent Mollusca; arranged according to their organization. London, van Voorst.
 Hemmen J. (2007) Recent Cancellariidae. Annotated and illustrated catalogue of Recent Cancellariidae. Privately published, Wiesbaden. 428 pp. [With amendments and corrections taken from Petit R.E. (2012) A critique of, and errata for, Recent Cancellariidae by Jens Hemmen, 2007. Conchologia Ingrata 9: 1-8

Cancellariidae